13 Reloaded (alternatively titled Thirteen Reloaded) is the fourth solo studio album by American rapper Havoc, one-half of the hip hop duo Mobb Deep. The album was released on November 18, 2014 by Hclass Entertainment, Inc. The album features guest appearances from Prodigy, Sheek Louch, Cormega, Ferg Brim and Mysonne. Album artwork by John Katehis.

Background 
The project serves as Havoc's fourth solo album, and the 1/2 of Mobb Deep tells us the focus for this album isn't the rapping, but rather, the production. "Not many guest appearances, it's all about the production. It's an album for the fans of Havoc's sound," he says.

Track listing
All tracks produced by Havoc

References 

2014 albums
Havoc (musician) albums
Albums produced by Havoc (musician)
Sequel albums